The 1916 Widnes by-election was held on 22 May 1916.  The by-election was held due to the incumbent Conservative MP, William Walker resigning to permit him to donate his entire thoroughbred racing stock to create a National Stud in an arm's-length transaction. He was returned unopposed at the by-election.

References

Widnes 1916
Widnes
1910s in Lancashire
Widnes 1916
Widnes 1916
Unopposed ministerial by-elections to the Parliament of the United Kingdom in English constituencies
Widnes 1916
Widnes